Kahit Puso'y Masugatan (International title: Hearts on Fire / ) is a 2012 Philippine melodrama television series directed by Wenn V. Deramas, starring Iza Calzado, Andi Eigenmann, Jake Cuenca and Gabby Concepcion. The series was aired on ABS-CBN's Primetime Bida evening block and worldwide on The Filipino Channel from July 9, 2012 to February 1, 2013.

Plot 
Andrea (Iza Calzado) and Veronica (Andi Eigenmann) are two different women brought together by fate. In their childhood years, they learned to love and care for each other like real sisters. The two were inseparable until unfortunate circumstances set them apart.

Through time, Andrea grew up to be a patient but determined young lady who would do everything for her loved ones, while Veronica grew to be possessive with her life and will do everything she can in her power to get what she wants, including the man she truly loves. When their paths meet again after so many years, the bonds of sisterhood they used to share will be put to test as they fall in love with the same man, Rafael (Jake Cuenca).

As if things weren't complicated enough as they are, Rafael faces a dilemma of his own as his wealthy father Miguel (Gabby Concepcion) falls for Andrea and even asks her hand in marriage. The plot thickens when Andrea also falls for Miguel, her ex-boyfriend's father, and she is willing to take the risk for Miguel and fight for their love no matter what, after all, love is all about risk. This complicated situation is explored in the subsequent parts of the story.

Cast and characters

Main cast 
 Iza Calzado as Andrea San Jose-de Guzman
 Andi Eigenmann as Veronica Salvacion
 Jake Cuenca as Rafael de Guzman
 Gabby Concepcion as Miguel de Guzman

Supporting cast 
 Barbara Perez as Doña Cleotilde Canlas
 Jaclyn Jose as Esther Gerona-Espiritu
 Malou de Guzman as Madonna Toledo
 Cris Villanueva as Dr. Bong Madriaga
 DJ Durano as Luis Gerona
 Jenny Miller as Salve Gerona
 Joey Paras as Brian
 Marx Topacio as Balong
 Pamu Pamorada as Rebecca "Bekka" Espiritu
 Kit Thompson as Alberto "Ambet" Espiritu
 Myrtle Sarrosa as Monique Santos
 Yves Flores as Mico

Guest cast 
 Lito Pimentel as Antonio "Tony" Espiritu
 Robi Domingo as Gerald Fernandez
 Alex Castro as Christian Morales
 Edward Mendez as Cong. Salcedo
 Matthew Mendoza as Jerome Fernandez
 Frances Ignacio as Amanda Balmaceda
 Maricar de Mesa as Melanie Espiritu
 Helga Krapf as Vangie Morales
 Lemuel Pelayo as Mark Castillo
 Wendy Valdez as Wilma
 Carlo Romero as Joaquin
 Jose Sarasola as Aaron
 Eagle Riggs as Frida
 Dang Cruz as Tonya
 Johan Santos as Winston
 Manuel Chua as Jeff
 Tess Antonio as Ethel
 Andre Tiangco as ER Doctor
 Joko Diaz as Eric
 Marc Solis as Marco Abraham
 Roldan Aquino as Major

Special participation 
 Mylene Dizon as Fatima San Jose
 Assunta de Rossi as Belen Salvacion
 Mickey Ferriols as Grace de Guzman
 Issa Pressman as preteen Andrea
 Jairus Aquino as preteen Balong
 Carlo Lacana as preteen Rafael
 Andrea Brillantes as young Veronica (credited as Blythe Gorostiza)
 Dexie Daulat as young Andrea
 Cajo Gomez as young Rafael
 Khaycee Aboloc as young Bekka
 Nikki Bagaporo as Weng

Soundtrack 
The drama's main theme song is "Sayang" by Zsa Zsa Padilla. Insert songs also include "Bakit Ba Minamahal Kita?" by Angeline Quinto and "Hindi Na Magbabago" by Erik Santos.

See also 
 List of programs broadcast by ABS-CBN
 List of ABS-CBN drama series

References

External links 
 Official website
 

ABS-CBN drama series
2012 Philippine television series debuts
2013 Philippine television series endings
Philippine melodrama television series
Philippine romance television series
Filipino-language television shows
Television shows filmed in the Philippines